Auszeichnungen für gute Bauten Graubünden is an architecture prize that has been awarded by the Gutes Bauen Graubünden since 1987.

History 

The Gutes Bauen Graubünden association is organized by the following associations: Federation of Swiss Architects, Bündner Heimatschutz, Bündner Association for Spatial Development, Heritage Protection Section Engadin and Southern Valleys, Institute for Building in the Alpine Region, Schweizerischer Werkbund and Swiss Association of Engineers and Architects.
The award aims to promote discussion about architecture and thereby create awareness for building culture.
New buildings from the fields of architecture and engineering, conversions, restorations, exterior design (squares, gardens, etc.) as well as implemented urban planning and approved spatial planning projects can be submitted for assessment.

Winners

1987  
 Peter Zumthor
 Robert Obrist
 Max Kasper

1994 
 Gigon/Guyer
 Gion A. Caminada
 Bearth & Deplazes
 Richard Brosi
 Peter Zumthor

2001 
 Jürg Conzett
 Valerio Olgiati
 Gigon/Guyer
 Christian Menn
 Bearth & Deplazes

2013 
 Raphael Zuber
 Gion A. Caminada
 Miller & Maranta
 Armando Ruinelli

2017  
 Gion A. Caminada
 Peter Zumthor
 Bearth & Deplazes

2021 
 Conzett Bronzini Partner
 Armando Ruinelli
 Bearth & Deplazes
 Marques Architekten AG
 Gion A. Caminada

References

External links 
 

Architecture awards